KCBL (1340 AM is an American sports radio station. Established in 1953 as KMAK and licensed to serve Fresno, California, United States, the station is currently owned by iHeartMedia, Inc.  The station switched to the current "KCBL" call sign on December 16, 1996.  Its studios are located on Shaw Avenue in North Fresno, and the transmitter tower is north of downtown near Fresno City College.

The first station to occupy 1340 kHz in Fresno was KFRE (cf. White's Radio Log, May 1942) which later took over 940 kHz from KTKC, Visalia.

KCBL serves as the local affiliate for Fox Sports Radio and NBC Sports Radio. In 2021, the Fresno State Bulldogs announced that KCBL would become the new flagship of Fresno State athletics.

References

External links
FCC History Cards for KCBL
KCBL official website

CBL
Sports radio stations in the United States
Radio stations established in 1953
1953 establishments in California
IHeartMedia radio stations
Fox Sports Radio stations